Boris Papandopulo (February 25, 1906 – October 16, 1991) was a Croatian composer and conductor of Greek and Russian Jewish descent. He was the son of Greek nobleman Konstantin Papandopulo and Croatian opera singer Maja Strozzi-Pečić and one of the most distinctive Croatian musicians of the 20th century. Papandopulo also worked as music writer, journalist, reviewer, pianist and piano accompanist; however, he achieved the peaks of his career in music as a composer. His composing oeuvre is imposing (counting cca 460 works): with great success he created instrumental (orchestral, concertante, chamber and solo), vocal and instrumental (for solo voice and choir), stage music and film music. In all these kinds and genres he left a string of anthology-piece compositions of great artistic value.

Biography

“Born, growing up and being brought up in a family that had always been tightly connected with music and the theatre”, he devoted himself to music very early on. He first of all took private lessons in piano, and then studied composition at the Music Academy in Zagreb (where he attended the lectures of Dugan, Lhotka and Dobronić, and studied composition in and graduated from the class of Blagoje Bersa in 1929). In Vienna, at the New Vienna Conservatory, he studied conducting under Dirk Fock (1928–1930). During two periods (1928–1934 and 1938–1946) he was a conductor of the Croatian Singing Association called Kolo, Zagreb, and from 1931 to 1934 had posts of conductor of the Society Orchestra of the Croatian Music Institute and choirmaster of the "Ivan Filipović" Teachers’ Singing Association (which he himself founded in 1933). From 1935 to 1938, he worked as a teacher at the State Music School in Split, and was conductor of the Zvonimir Music Association, as well as, from 1940 to 1945, of the Zagreb Opera (from 1943 to 1945 he was its director). At the same time he was a conductor of the orchestra of Radio Zagreb (1942–1945). After World War II he was a director of the Rijeka Opera (1946–1948 and 1953–1959), while, from 1948 to 1953 he was an opera conductor and a teacher in Sarajevo. He took up his career in Zagreb again as a conductor of the Zagreb Opera (1959–1968) and then the Split Opera (1968–1974). He was a regular guest-conductor of the Komedija Theatre in Zagreb, as well as of the Cairo Symphony Orchestra.

Oeuvre

Papandopulo's youthful opuses were marked by features of the “national music style”, as it was called, that is, of patterns from folk music (either direct quotations or in the sense of the raw material and modal scale structures), while cosmopolitan influences are also appreciable: the application of composition technique elements of the neo-Classical style: polyphonic in structure, with Baroque energy and vital rhythmic movement, elementary touches of Impressionist and Expressionist musical idioms. Along with a treatment of the instruments that makes great demands on skill, technique and virtuosity, very visible are the optimism and serenity that permeate the music to the full.  Connoisseurs of the composer's oeuvre of the earlier (youthful) creative period pick out as the most successful works his Laudamus (Slavoslovije), cantata for solo voices, mixed voice choir and orchestra; Sinfonietta for String Orchestra (published by Breitkopf und Härtel), Zlato / Gold, a mime ballet with singing and orchestra; the brilliant, bravura Concerto da camera for Solo Soprano, Violin and Seven Wind Instruments (published by Vienna's Universal Edition) and the most important Croatian religious works from the end of that period of Papandopulo's creativity – the oratorio for solo voices and a male a cappella choir Muka Gospodina našega Isukrsta / The Passion of Our Lord Jesus Christ and Hrvatska misa / Croatian Mass for soloists and a cappella mixed voice choir.

In his mature creative period, Papandopulo retains elements of folk music idiom, but also addresses the achievements of the European musical Moderne, without “departing from the traditional formants of musical cells, from the settled development of motif and facture or the well-established laws of melodic movement.” This period, revolving around the temporal axis of the end of World War II (1945), lasted until about 1956, and gave rise to a number of very successful compositions marked by recent history – the creation of the new state and events from the National Liberation War (Symphony No. 2, Poema o Neretvi / Poem about the Neretva, Stojanka majka Knežopoljka / Stojanka, A Knežopolje Mother, a musical poem for soprano solo, choir and large orchestra, Obnova / Reconstruction, a symphonic movement for large orchestra).

In time his music became more dissonant, rougher in harmony and melody. In the mid-1950s he integrated into his composing technical arsenal elements of dodecaphony, jazz (most vigorously in the late fifties and early sixties; Concerto for Piano and Orchestra No 3, Mosaic for Classical String Quartet and Jazz Quartet, Capriccio for Violin Solo and Jazz Quartet, Ein Orchestermosaik and so on). Later, pop came in, as did other technical composition techniques of the avant-garde in music of the 20th century, although he retained an ironical distance from some of them, subjecting them on occasions to irony or parody.
The origin of part of Papandopulo's oeuvre of the 1960s and 1970s is related to his guest appearances and acquaintanceships with musicians in the then divided Germany (FRG and GDR), where he had opportunities to meet outstanding artistic personalities, as well as recent European musical creation.

Ideologically grounded aesthetic worldviews never inhibited Papandopulo in his choice of non-musical subjects for his own works; he always found, in each one of them, universal ideas, profound human values. At the beginning of this work he found non-musical stimuli in topics related to the older strata of the folk tradition – in “legends, rites and myths” (Svatovske / Bridal, Dodolice, a Folk Ritual for the Solo Soprano, Piano and Girl's Choir Op 2, Zlato / Gold, Utva zlatokrila / Ruddy Shellduck). Later, after 1950, very curiously, he drew his inspiration from apparently diametrically opposed worldviews. At the same time he would write compositions of religious topics – from the Croatian Catholic mass with traces and elements of Glagolitic chant (Osorski rekvijem / Osor Requiem, Pučka poljička misa / Folk Mass from Poljica, the cantata Jubilate and a number of smaller religious works) and also monumental works of socialist realism (inspired by the ideology and poetics of the post-war socialist revolution and the People's Liberation War, such as the musical-poetical work Pasija po srcu / Passion After the Heart, the poetic-musical vision Credo, 1943 – cycle of songs to words by Ivan Goran Kovačić) as well as those inspired by Croatian history (the cantatas Libertas, Pohvala Dubrovniku / In Praise of Dubrovnik, Non bene pro toto libertas venditur auro, Mile Gojslavica and the triptych for mixed voice choir and large symphony orchestra Istarske freske / Istrian Frescos and so on).

Papandopulo went on composing with vigour and inspiration almost to the day of his death, a full 65 years. In all these works he showed himself a master of his craft – a witty musician of inexhaustible and fresh inspiration, very well versed in the technical procedure of composition, of musical forms and the technical capacities of both instruments and voice.
As well as a number of concerts and solo works for individual instruments Papandopulo left a marked trace on the ballet and opera of his time. His six operas (Amfitrion, Rona, Sunčanica, Madame Buffault, Kentervilski duh / The Canterville Ghost, Požar u operi / Fire in the Opera House) and 15 ballets (Žetva / The Harvest, Tri kavalira gospođice Melanije / Miss Melania's Three Gentlemen, Teuta, Horoscope (ballet suite for two pianos), Ties (ballet sketch for chamber ensemble), Gold (pantomime ballet with singing and orchestra), Kći dalmatinskih planina / Daughter of Dalmatian Mountains, Intermezzo, Beatrice Cenci, Gitanella, “Dr. Atom”, Kraljevo, Prsten / The Ring, Menschen im Hotel, Der Königsreiher) have demonstrated their anthological values in the many repeated performances at home and around the world. He composed music for an impressive number of stage productions and films, and also devoted some of his opuses for children and young people (puppet performances, instrumental compositions and instrumental concerti).

A large number of his works feature an authentic and typically Papandopulo buoyant and infectious musical humour (in a large range from tonal play full of brightness to flippancy and rough musical grotesquery) in which he often quotes themes of other authors (Grotesque for Tuba, Piano and Percussion, Pop Concerto for Two Pianos and Orchestra, Magic Flute, Papandopulijada, Divertimento alla pasticcio and so on).
It is not possible to give a concise, pithy and yet comprehensive evaluation of Papandopulo's vast oeuvre from today's point of view because of the inaccessibility of the scores.  Nevertheless, Dubravko Detoni, himself a composer, did make an effort in this direction in the following words: “If it were necessary to utter some kind of definition, then a summation of Papandopulo’s oeuvre should be sought in its being some kind of synthesis of all the more important modern influences from world music in combination with rhythmical, melodic and harmonic features of the Croatian folk melody.”
Irrespective of the time of composition or the stylistic or musical expressive orientation, Papandopulo's “music very easily and spontaneously makes direct contact with the listener”, and musicians are glad to play it.

Boris Papandopulo played an important role as an arranger of folk songs from the wider region (Central Europe) and as populariser and arranger of works of other composers. This particularly refers to anthological compositions of Croatian concertante and operatic music, some of which he revitalised and put on the stage in his own arrangement (some of the works of Lisinski, Zajc and Krežma, for example).

Selected works

Opera
 Sunčanica
 Amfitrion
 Rona

Ballet
 Zlato
 Teuta
 Kraljevo

Orchestra
 Hommage à Bach (1972)
 Sinfonietta for String Orchestra, Op. 79
 Istarske freske
 Podnevna simfonija

Concertante
 Concerto da Camera for Soprano and Chamber Ensemble, Op.11
 Concerto for Violin and Orchestra (1943)
 Concerto for Double Bass and String Orchestra (1968)
 Concerto for Harpsichord and String Orchestra (1962)
 Percussion Concerto (1969)
 Concerto for Piano and String Orchestra
 Concerto for Piano and Orchestra No. 3 (1959)
 Concerto for Timpani and Orchestra
 Concerto for Alto Saxophone and Orchestra
 Little Concerto for Piccolo and String Orchestra (1977)

Chamber / instrumental
 Clarinet Quintet (1960)
 Dialogue for Flute and Harpsichord
 Elegie for Bassoon and Piano
 Introduzione, Ariosa, Danza for Cello and Piano
 Kleine Suite for 4 Trombones (1981)
 Monolog for Violin Solo
 Rhapsody for Cello Solo (1987)
 Sonata for Viola and Piano (1963)
 Sonata for Violin and Piano
 String Quartet No. 5 (1970)
 Three Yugoslavian Dances for Guitar
 Rapsodia Concertante for Cello and Piano

Keyboard
 Contradanza for Piano
 Hrvatski tanac (Croatian Dance) for Piano, Op.48
 Osam studija (8 Etudes) for Piano
 Partita for Piano
 Passacaglia for Organ
 Scherzo Fantastico for Piano

Vocal
 Čakavska Suita for (High) Voice and Orchestra
 Hrvatska Misa (Croatian Mass) in D Minor for Soprano, Alto, Tenor and Baritone Soloists and Mixed Chorus, Op.86 (1939)
 Muka gospodina našega isukrsta , Oratorio for Soloists and Male Chorus a Cappella, Op.61
 Marulova pisan
 Osorski Requiem
 Five Orchestral Songs for Baritone, String Orchestra, and Harp (1961)
 Stojanka majka Knežopoljka for Soprano, Chorus and Orchestra

References

Further reading
 Boris Papandopulo – zanemareni hrvatski Mozart 
 Boris 

1906 births
1991 deaths
Croatian people of Greek descent
Croatian people of Russian-Jewish descent
Academy of Music, University of Zagreb alumni
Croatian conductors (music)
Male conductors (music)
Croatian opera composers
Croatian classical composers
Croatian classical musicians
Jewish classical musicians
Jewish opera composers
Vladimir Nazor Award winners
Burials at Mirogoj Cemetery
Members of the Croatian Academy of Sciences and Arts
20th-century conductors (music)
20th-century classical composers
Male classical composers
Greek classical composers
Greek classical musicians
20th-century male musicians
German emigrants to Yugoslavia
People from Bad Honnef